Events from the year 1424 in France

Incumbents
 Monarch – Charles VII

Events
 17 August - The English army under John, Duke of Bedford win a major victory at the Battle of Verneuil over Franco-Scottish forces as part of the Hundred Years War

Births
 Unknown - Félizé Regnard, courtier and royal mistress (died 1474)

Deaths
 17 August - John Stewart, Earl of Buchan, leader of the Scottish troops fighting for France in the Hundred Years War (born 1381)
 17 August - John VIII of Harcourt, nobleman and soldier (born 1396)
 Unknown - Joan II, Countess of Auvergne (born 1378)

References

1420s in France